Yanapaccha (possibly from Quechua yana black, phaqcha waterfall, "black waterfall") is a mountain in the Cordillera Blanca in the Andes of Peru, about  high. It is situated in the Ancash Region, Yungay Province, in the districts Yanama and Yungay. Yanapaccha lies in the Huascarán National Park, southeast of Chacraraju.

References

External links 

Mountains of Peru
Mountains of Ancash Region
Glaciers of Peru